Timaeus (or Timaios) is a Greek name. It may refer to:

Timaeus (dialogue), a Socratic dialogue by Plato
Timaeus of Locri, 5th-century BC Pythagorean philosopher, appearing in Plato's dialogue
Timaeus (historian) (c. 345 BC-c. 250 BC), Greek historian from Tauromenium in Sicily
Timaeus the Sophist, Greek philosopher who lived sometime between the 1st and 4th centuries, supposed writer of a lexicon of Platonic words
Timaeus, mentioned in Mark 10:46 as the father of Bartimaeus
Timaeus (crater), a lunar crater named after the philosopher
Timaeus, one of the Three Legendary Dragons from the Japanese anime series Yu-Gi-Oh!
Timaios or Tutimaios, a pharaoh of Egypt mentioned by Josephus in his Contra Apionem, sometimes identified with Dedumose II